Joseph Hopper Nicholson (May 15, 1770 – March 4, 1817) was an American lawyer, jurist, and politician from Maryland.

Born in Chestertown, Kent County, Maryland, Nicholson graduated from Washington College in 1787 and studied law.  He was admitted to the bar and practiced, and also served as a member of the Maryland House of Delegates from 1796 to 1798.  He was elected as a Democratic-Republican to the Sixth and to the three succeeding Congresses and served from March 4, 1799 until his resignation on March 1, 1806.  In Congress, Nicholson was one of the managers appointed by the House of Representatives in January 1804 to conduct the impeachment proceedings against John Pickering, judge of the United States District Court for New Hampshire, and in December of the same year against Samuel Chase, Associate Justice of the Supreme Court of the United States. Nicholson was significantly ill in February 1801 when the House decided the Election of 1800, yet was carried on a stretcher to the Capitol to vote for Jefferson.

During the War of 1812, Nicholson participated in the defense of Fort McHenry.  He served as chief justice of the sixth judicial district of Maryland and associate justice of the Maryland Court of Appeals from March 26, 1806 until his death at his home in Baltimore County, Maryland.  He is interred in the family cemetery on the Lloyd estate of "Wye House" near Easton, Talbot County, Maryland.

References

External links 

1770 births
1817 deaths
Judges of the Maryland Court of Appeals
Members of the Maryland House of Delegates
People from Chestertown, Maryland
American people of the War of 1812
18th-century American Episcopalians
19th-century American Episcopalians
Democratic-Republican Party members of the United States House of Representatives from Maryland
People from Baltimore County, Maryland